Al-Asha'wb is a sub-district located in Mudhaykhirah District, Ibb Governorate, Yemen. Al-Asha'wb had a population of 18,134 according to the 2004 census.

References 

Sub-districts in Mudhaykhirah District